Smale is a surname. Notable people with the surname include:

Bob Smale, American pianist on The Lawrence Welk Show
John G. Smale (1927-2011), American businessman
Sir John Jackson Smale, British lawyer and Chief Justice of Hong Kong
Stephen Smale, American mathematician

Holly Smale, British author